Calochortus concolor, also known by the common name goldenbowl mariposa lily, is a species of flowering plant in the lily family.

It is endemic to the Peninsular Ranges, in Southern California (U.S.) and northern Baja California (México). It grows on slopes in chaparral, woodland, and forest habitats.

Description
Calochortus concolor is a perennial herb growing an erect stem 30 to 60 centimeters tall. The waxy basal leaf is 10 to 20 centimeters long and withers at flowering.

The inflorescence bears 1 to 7 erect bell-shaped flowers. Each flower has three sepals and three yellow petals with reddish areas near the bases.

The fruit is a narrow, angled capsule up to 8 centimeters long.

References

External links
Jepson Manual Treatment of Calochortus concolor
USDA Plants Profile for Calochortus concolor
Flora of North America
UC Photos gallery — Calochortus concolor

concolor
Flora of California
Flora of Baja California
Natural history of the California chaparral and woodlands
Natural history of the Peninsular Ranges
~
~
Flora and fauna of the San Jacinto Mountains
~